Argyrodines is a genus of beetles in the family Cerambycidae, containing the following species:

 Argyrodines aurivillii (Gounelle, 1905)
 Argyrodines pulchella Bates, 1867

References

Rhopalophorini